Garhdiwala is a town and a municipal council in Hoshiarpur district  in the state of Punjab, India.

History 
Around the town, there are some grooves of mangoes. However area is famous for tree farming i.e. Populus and Eucalyptus and dominated by Hindu Rajput population

The Town gets its name from "Devi Mandir" situated at the heart of the town. People generally call it "Garh Devi Wala". 

Khalsa Senior Secondary School is the oldest was built (in 1921) by the Great Chaudhary Boor Singh along with renowned and prominent persons of the area and this school has given Punjab great officers, intellects and players of international level.

It produced soldiers like  Commodore Harbans Singh Sahota, Col Dogra, Col Naresh Talwar and Major Sandeep Kumar Dadwal. This small town has also produced kabaddi players like Mehnga Singh, Chaudhary Harbux Singh, and Sohan Singh.

It is  well connected with Hoshiarpur, Pathankot and Gurdaspur cities by road. And it's a frequently visited town from some of the nearby villages i.e. Banda, Fatehpur, Bhanowal, Bhattlan,Bahtiwal and Chatiyaliya.

People are generally prosperous and educated

Transport 

Garhdiwala city is situated on Chandigarh - Jammu road at State Highway-24, approximately 30 km north-east to Hoshiarpur. The nearest railway station is in Dasuya Railway Station-DZA (12 KM away)

Facilities

This moderate town is a very close-knit community and a business hub for numerous villages around it. Local business ranges from grocery, jewellers, clothing merchants, hardware stores, chemist, electrical and electronics suppliers to cold storage and wheat storage facilities. There are various doctor clinics, banks, and educational institutions.
Garhdiwala has its own Police Station and Post office as well.

Education 
Khalsa College
 Mount Carmel School [ICSE]
 Khalsa Sr. Secondary School
 St. Soldier Divine Public School
Government Sr. Secondary School
KRK DAV School
Lala Jagat Narayan DAV Public School
 Sant Baba Harnam Singh Public School
 Okara Arya Putri Pathshala
 Holy Heart School
 Bassi Model School
 Cambridge Prep School

Markets

 Seth Market
 Gandhi Market
 Main Bazaar
 Shiv Shakti Market
 Chaudhary Complex
 Kokla Market
 Dana Mandi
 Devi Mandir Bazaar
 Thana Bazaar

Climate

The city has a humid subtropical climate with cool winters and long, hot summers. Summer Temperatures vary from average highs of around 47 °C to average lows of around 22 °C. Winter temperatures have highs of 19 °C to lows of 1 °C. Southwest monsoon season occurs during July and August. Throughout year, average rainfall is 710mm.

Demographics

 India census,  Gardhiwala had a population of 7593. Males constitute 51% of the population and females 49%. Garhdiwala has a higher literacy rate compared to Punjab. In 2011, the literacy rate of Garhdiwala was 87.24% compared to 75.84% of Punjab: Male literacy stands at 92.82% while the female literacy rate was 81.73%.

References

Cities and towns in Hoshiarpur district